The 2005 Regions Morgan Keegan Championships and the Cellular South Cup were tennis tournaments played on indoor hard courts. It was the 30th edition of the Regions Morgan Keegan Championships, the 20th edition of the Cellular South Cup, and was part of the International Series Gold of the 2005 ATP Tour, and of the Tier III Series of the 2005 WTA Tour. Both the men's and the women's events took place at the Racquet Club of Memphis in Memphis, Tennessee, United States, from February 14 through February 20, 2005.

Finals

Men's singles

 Kenneth Carlsen defeated  Max Mirnyi, 7–5, 7–5

Women's singles

 Vera Zvonareva defeated  Meghann Shaughnessy, 7–6(7–3), 6–2

Men's doubles

 Simon Aspelin /  Todd Perrey defeated  Bob Bryan /  Mike Bryan, 6–4, 6–4

Women's doubles

 Miho Saeki /  Yuka Yoshida defeated  Laura Granville /  Abigail Spears 6–3, 6–4

References

External links
 Official website 
 ATP tournament profile

Regions Morgan Keegan Championships
Cellular South Cup
Regions Morgan Keegan Championships and the Cellular South Cupl
Regions Morgan Keegan Championships and the Cellular South Cup
Regions Morgan Keegan Championships and the Cellular South Cup
U.S. National Indoor Championships